Burt Prelutsky (January 5, 1940 – December 17, 2021) was an American screenwriter, newspaper columnist, and author.

Early life and career
A graduate of Fairfax High School, Prelutsky was a film critic for Los Angeles Magazine from 1961 to 1971, writing acerbic reviews that gained him a reputation as "the fastest barb in the west." He also wrote a weekly column for the Los Angeles Times' magazine,  West.

In the late 1960s he wrote several episodes of the Dragnet TV series.

He wrote eight episodes of the M*A*S*H TV series during seasons four, five, and six, including The Novocaine Mutiny, The General's Practitioner, The Grim Reaper and Quo Vadis, Captain Chandler?

In 2000 Prelutsky was one of the earliest plaintiffs to sign on to a class action lawsuit brought against  television talent agencies, networks and production studios accused of discrimination against older writers.  The suit was settled in 2010 for $70 million.

Awards and recognition
In 1985 Prelutsky won a Writers Guild of America Award in the original comedy anthology category for the 1983 TV movie Hobson's Choice.  He was nominated for an Edgar Allan Poe Award in 1982 under the category "Best Television Feature or Miniseries" for his work on the 1981 television movie A Small Killing, and in 1976 was nominated for a Humanitas Prize in the category "30 Minute Network or Syndicated Television" for his work on the Quo Vadis 1975 episode of the television program M*A*S*H.

He received a Christopher Award in 1987 for A Winner Never Quits, a TV movie that was broadcast on CBS in 1986.

Personal life and death
Prelutsky died on December 17, 2021, at the age of 81.

References

External links
 Burt Prelutsky at The Patriot Post
 BurtPrelutsky.com (archived)
 Burt Prelutsky at Townhall.com

 

1940 births
2021 deaths
American screenwriters
Writers from Chicago
Fairfax High School (Los Angeles) alumni